Mangateparu is a farming service community located close to the west bank of the Piako River, eight kilometres north of Morrinsville in the Waikato region of New Zealand.  It has a population of about 400 people. The local school was forced to close in 2004.

The name comes from the Māori words "manga", stream; "te", the; and "paru", muddy or deep.

The community of Tauhei is located a short distance away to the west.

Education

References

Populated places in Waikato
Matamata-Piako District